Flora is plant life collectively.

Flora may also refer to:

Microbiology
 Flora (microbiology), collective bacteria and other microorganisms in a host
 Flora or microbiota, the collective bacteria and other microorganisms in an animal host

People
 Flora (given name), a given name (including a list of people with the name)
 Flora (surname), a surname (including a list of people with the name)

Places

Norway
 Flora, Norway, a municipality in Sunnfjord
 Flora, Trøndelag, a village in Selbu municipality in Trøndelag county

United States
 Flora Lake, California
 Flora, Florida, a former community
 Flora, Illinois, a city
 Flora Township, Boone County, Illinois
 Flora, Indiana, a town
 Flora, Miami County, Indiana, an unincorporated community
 Flora Township, Dickinson County, Kansas
 Flora, Louisiana, an unincorporated community
 Flora Township, Renville County, Minnesota
 Flora, Mississippi, a town
 Flora, Ohio, a ghost town
 Flora, Oregon, an unincorporated community

Elsewhere
 Mount Flora, Antarctic Peninsula
 Flora, Apayao, a municipality in the Philippines
 Flora, Suriname, a resort

Arts and entertainment

Music
 La Flora, a 1628 opera by Marco da Fagliano
 Florakören, also called Flora, a Finnish choir
 Flora (aka Lily of the West), an Irish folk song

Paintings
 Flora (Francesco Melzi)
 Flora (De Morgan)
 Flora (Rembrandt, Hermitage)
 Flora (Titian)
 Flora (Jan Massys)

Sculptures
 Flora Fountain, South Mumbai, India
 Flora (bust), a bust attributed to Leonardo da Vinci

Other arts and entertainment
 Flora (film), a 2017 Canadian independent film
 An elephant in the 2008 film Saving Flora (2018), performed by Tia
 An elephant and the namesake of Circus Flora
 Flora, a character in Winx Club

Other uses
 Hurricane Flora, one of the deadliest hurricanes on record
 Flora (mythology), a goddess in Roman mythology
 , several British warships
 Flora family, a large grouping of asteroids
 8 Flora, the largest asteroid in the family
 Flora (Prague Metro), a metro station in Prague, Czech Republic
 Flora station (Illinois), a historic rail depot in Flora, Illinois, United States
 The Flora, a closed pub in London, England
 Flora Chapel, a church in Selbu municipality in Trøndelag county, Norway
 FC Flora, a football team in Tallinn, Estonia
 Flora (publication), a printed or digital work that describes the plant species in a particular area or region
 Flora (margarine), a brand of margarine
 Flora (grape), a California wine grape

See also
 
 Flora-2, open-source software for knowledge representation and reasoning
 Flores (disambiguation)
 Floro (disambiguation)